Templeton may refer to:

Places
 Templeton station, Richmond, British Columbia, Canada
 Templeton, New Zealand

United Kingdom

 Templeton, Angus, Scotland
 Templeton, Devon, England
 Templeton, Pembrokeshire, Wales
 RAF Templeton
 Templeton, near Gatehead, East Ayrshire, Scotland
 Templeton, West Berkshire, England; See List of United Kingdom locations: Ta-Tha
 Templeton College, Oxford, England

United States
 Templeton, California
 Templeton, Indiana
 Templeton, Iowa
 Templeton, Massachusetts

Organisations
 James Templeton & Co, a Scottish textile company
 Franklin Templeton Investments, an American holding company
 John Templeton Foundation, a philanthropic organization with a spiritual or religious inclination

People
 Alan Templeton, American geneticist and statistician
 Alec Templeton (1909/10–1963), Welsh-American musician
 Alexandra Templeton (born 1969), British lecturer
 Bert Templeton (1940–2003), Canadian junior ice hockey coach
 Brad Templeton (born 1960), Canadian software engineer and entrepreneur
 Charles Templeton (disambiguation), several people
 Danny Templeton, Scottish footballer active 1916–22
 David J. Templeton (1954–1997), Irish Presbyterian minister, murder victim
 David Templeton (born 1989), Scottish footballer
 Dink Templeton (1897–1962), American athlete and track and field coach
 Ed Templeton (born 1972), American professional skateboarder
 Edith Templeton (1916–2006), European novelist
 Fay Templeton (1865–1939), American stage actress
 Garry Templeton (born 1956), Major League Baseball player
 Henry Templeton (born 1963), Scottish footballer
 Herminie Templeton Kavanagh (1861–1933), Irish-American writer
 Hugh Templeton (born 1929), New Zealand politician 
 Ian Templeton (born 1929), New Zealand journalist
 James Templeton, Scottish footballer active 1897–1903
 John Templeton (1912–2008), British businessman and philanthropist
 John Templeton (disambiguation), several people
 Kelvin Templeton (born 1956), Australian rules footballer
 Malcolm Templeton (1924–2017), New Zealand diplomat
 Mark Templeton (disambiguation), several people
 Nathan Templeton (journalist), Australian sports presenter and reporter
 Rini Templeton (1935–1986), American graphic artist
 Rich Templeton, CEO and chairman of Texas Instruments
 Robert Templeton (disambiguation), several people
 Suzie Templeton (born 1967), British animator
 Thomas W. Templeton (1867–1935), American congressman
 Ty Templeton (born 1962), Canadian comic book artist
 William Templeton (disambiguation), several people

Fictional characters
 Templeton the Rat, in the American children's novel Charlotte's Web and its film adaptations
 Templeton Peck, in the American TV series The A-Team
 Nathan Templeton (Commander in Chief), in the American TV series Commander in Chief
 Timothy Leslie Templeton, in The Boss Baby and The Boss Baby: Back in Business
 Janice, Bill and Ivy Templeton, in Frank De Felitta's novel Audrey Rose and the film adaptation

Other uses
 Templeton Prize, philanthropic award offered by the Templeton Foundation
 Templeton Rye, a brand of rye whiskey originating in Templeton, Iowa

See also
 Templeton Rye, American rye whisky brand of Templeton Rye Spirits